Diplotaxis subcostata is a species of scarab beetle in the family Scarabaeidae. It is found in North America.

References

Further reading

 

Melolonthinae
Articles created by Qbugbot
Beetles described in 1851